Cameron Robin Wright (born 20 April 1994) is a South African rugby union player for the  in Super Rugby and in the Currie Cup. His regular position is scrum-half.

Career

Youth and Varsity Cup rugby

Wright represented KwaZulu-Natal at Under-16 level when he was selected in their squad for the Grant Khomo Week held in Upington in 2010. Two years later, he represented their Under-18 side at the 2012 Under-18 Craven Week tournament.

Later in the same year, Wright was a member of the  side that played in the 2012 Under-19 Provincial Championship, starting seven of their matches. He made twelve appearances for the team during the 2013 Under-19 Provincial Championship and graduated to the  side in 2014.

In 2014, Wright also played in the Varsity Shield competition for university side . He started all eight regular season matches for the side as they finished in second place. He also played in the final against , but could not prevent them slipping to a 35–26 defeat.

Sharks

References

External links
Cameron Wright on itsrugby.co.uk.

1994 births
Living people
Montpellier Hérault Rugby players
Rugby union players from Durban
Rugby union scrum-halves
Sharks (Currie Cup) players
Sharks (rugby union) players
South African rugby union players
Southern Kings players
Alumni of Hilton College (South Africa)